Kayla Taylor  (born 27 October 1994) is a Trinidad and Tobago women's international footballer who plays as a midfielder. She was a member of the Trinidad and Tobago women's national football team. She was part of the team at the 2016 CONCACAF Women's Olympic Qualifying Tournament. At the collegiate level, she plays for Wiley College in the United States.

International goals
Scores and results list Trinidad and Tobago's goal tally first

References

External links
 New York Magic player profile

1994 births
Living people
Trinidad and Tobago women's footballers
Place of birth missing (living people)
Women's association football midfielders
Trinidad and Tobago women's international footballers
Wiley College alumni